The 1989–90 UNLV Runnin' Rebels basketball team represented the University of Nevada Las Vegas in the 1989–90 NCAA Division I men's basketball season. They were led by 17th-year head coach Jerry Tarkanian. The team played its home games in the Thomas & Mack Center as a member of the Big West Conference. They finished the season 35–5, 16–2 in Big West play to win the regular season championship. They defeated Cal State Fullerton, Pacific, and Long Beach State to win the Big West tournament championship. As a result, the received the conference's automatic bid to the NCAA tournament as the No. 1 seed in the West region. They defeated Arkansas–Little Rock, Ohio State, Ball State, and Loyola Marymount to advance to the school's second Final Four in 4 years. In the Final Four, they defeated Georgia Tech to advance to the championship game where they defeated Duke for the school's only national championship.

The team was the last (as of 2022) outside of a major conference to win the national championship.

Previous season 
The Rebels finished the 1988–89 season 25–8, 16–2 in Big West play to win the regular season championship. They defeated UC Irvine, Cal State Fullerton, and New Mexico State to win the Big West tournament championship. As a result, they received the conference's automatic bid to the NCAA tournament as the No. 4 seed in the West region. They defeated Idaho, DePaul, and No. 1-seeded Arizona to advance to the Elite Eight where they lost to Seton Hall.

Season summary

NCAA Tournament 
UNLV won three of its tournament games by 30 points, but got a scare from Ball State in the regional semifinal, winning by just two points.

In the 1990 Tournament -

 UNLV's 103–73 win over Duke marked the first, (and to date, only), time in the history of the tournament that at least 100 points were scored in the championship game.
 UNLV’s 571 points over six games set the record for most points scored by a single team in any one year of the tournament.
 UNLV is the only team in tournament history to average more than 95 points per game, over six games. In six tournament games, they won three by exactly 30 points, while scoring more than 100 points in each 30-point victory.
UNLV and UCLA in 1965 are the only teams in tournament history to win three games all while scoring at least 100 points in each win. (Loyola Marymount also scored at least 100 points in three games in the 1990 tournament, but lost their last game, where they scored 101 points, to UNLV, by 30 points. UNLV also scored at least 100 points in three victories in the 1977 tournament, but their last one was in the Final Four consolation game.)
 UNLV’s 30-point margin of victory in the championship game is also a tournament record. ESPN called it the 36th “worst blowout in sports history.”
To date, UNLV remains the last team from a non-power conference (AAC, ACC, Big East, Big Ten, Big 12, Pac-12, and SEC) to win the national championship, since Louisville in 1986.  (Louisville was in The Metro Conference in 1986, which was considered a major basketball conference throughout its history, 1975 - 1995.)
The championship game was UNLV’s eleventh-consecutive win. They would eventually run the win streak to an astounding 45 games. That is the fourth-longest win streak in NCAA Division 1 basketball history, and the longest win streak since the longest one ever (by UCLA) ended in 1974.

(The nickname "Runnin' Rebels" is unique to men's basketball at UNLV. The default nickname for men's sports teams at the school is simply "Rebels", while all women's teams are known as "Lady Rebels".)

Roster

 

1989-90 UNLV Roster and StatsRebel-Net.com - Best of the 64 Era: The 1990 Runnin' Rebels

Schedule and results

|-
!colspan=12 style=| Regular Season

|-
!colspan=12 style=| Big West tournament

|-
!colspan=12 style=| NCAA Tournament

Sources Rebel-Net.com - Best of the 64 Era: The 1990 Runnin' Rebels1989-90 UNLV Schedule and Results

Rankings

Awards and honors
 Anderson Hunt, NCAA Men's MOP Award
 Larry Johnson, Consensus First-team All-American and Big West Conference Player of the Year
 Stacey Augmon – NABC Defensive Player of the Year (2)

Team players drafted into the NBA

References

Unlv
UNLV Runnin' Rebels basketball seasons
NCAA Division I men's basketball tournament Final Four seasons
NCAA Division I men's basketball tournament championship seasons
Unlv
Unlv
Unlv